Incitement to ethnic or racial hatred is a crime under the laws of several countries.

Australia
In Australia, the Racial Hatred Act 1995 amends the Racial Discrimination Act 1975, inserting Part IIA – Offensive Behaviour Because of Race, Colour, National or Ethnic Origin.  It does not, however, address the issue of incitement to racial hatred. The Australian state of Victoria has addressed the question, however, with its enactment of the Racial and Religious Tolerance Act 2001.

Finland
In Finland, agitation against an ethnic group is a crime according to the Criminal Code of Finland's (1889/39 and 2011/511) chapter 11, section 10:

Section 10 – Ethnic agitation (511/2011)

"A person who makes available to the public or otherwise spreads among the public or keeps available for the public information, an expression of opinion or another message where a certain group is threatened, defamed or insulted on the  basis of its race, skin colour, birth status, national or ethnic origin, religion or  belief, sexual orientation or disability or a comparable basis, shall be sentenced  for ethnic agitation to a fine or to imprisonment for at most two years."

Section 10(a) – Aggravated ethnic agitation (511/2011)

France 
Section 24 of the Press Law of 1881 criminalizes incitement to racial discrimination, hatred, or violence on the basis of one's origin or membership in an ethnic, national, racial, or religious group. A criminal code provision deems it an offense to engage in similar conduct via private communication.

In 2002, four Muslim organizations filed a complaint against Michel Houellebecq for stating that Islam was "stupid" and "dangerous" in an interview. The court found that Houellebecq was not immune from the charge on the grounds of literary immunity or freedom of speech, but acquitted him on the grounds that he criticized Islam rather than individual Muslims. In 2005, politician Jean Marie Le Pen was convicted of inciting racial hatred, for comments made to Le Monde in 2003 about the consequences of Muslim immigration in France. Similar complaints were brought in 2015 after he compared Muslim street prayers to the Nazi occupation of France in 2010, but he was acquitted. In 2008, actress and animal-rights campaigner Brigitte Bardot was convicted on charges of inciting racial hatred for her criticism concerning the ritual slaughter of sheep during the feast of Eid al-Adha in a letter to then-Interior Minister Nicolas Sarkozy. Bardot had been convicted of inciting racial hatred on four other occasions over the previous 11 years for criticizing Muslim immigration.

Germany

Sweden

The current Swedish legislation on incitement of hatred against a population group dates back to 1948, and originally only criminalised incitement to hatred based on 'origin' and religion.  The actions of the notorious Swedish anti-semite Einar Åberg was cited as one of the reasons for the laws introduction. In 1970 the law was amended to specifically name race and skin colour as well as national and ethnic origin. The law was widened to include hatred based on sexuality in 2002 and gender identity and expression in 2018.

United Kingdom
Under the law of the United Kingdom, "incitement to racial hatred" was established as an offence by the provisions of ss. 17–29 of the Public Order Act 1986, punishable by two years' imprisonment (now seven years). It was first established as a criminal offence in the Race Relations Act 1976.

This offence refers to:
 deliberately provoking hatred of a racial group
 distributing racist material to the public
 making inflammatory public speeches
 creating racist websites on the Internet
 inciting inflammatory rumours about an individual or an ethnic group, for the purpose of spreading racial discontent.

In England and Wales, laws against incitement to hatred against people on religious grounds were later established under the Racial and Religious Hatred Act 2006.

See also 
 Hate speech
 International Covenant on Civil and Political Rights, (Article 20, 2)
 International Convention on the Elimination of All Forms of Racial Discrimination (Article 4)
 Public Order Act 1986
 Crime and Disorder Act 1998
 Religious intolerance

References

External links
 Government information on the race relations act
 Commission for racial equality
 Crime Reduction Toolkits: Racist Incidents and Harassment

Race and law
Hate speech
Censorship